Antipathes is a genus of coral in the order Antipatharia, composed of black coral (so named for its black skeleton). Distinct features vary greatly within this genus: it contains symmetrically aligned as well as irregularly shaped corals, a range of different colors, and colonies that can be either sparsely branched or closely packed. polyps for these corals have six tentacles that are each lined with stinging cells. Unlike their reef-building cousins, these coral lack photosynthesizing algae and are not restricted to the lighter surface regions. They prefer to live in deeper waters near currents so they can catch and eat passing zooplankton.

Species
Species included in this genus are:

 Antipathes aculeata (Brook, 1889)
 Antipathes arborea Dana, 1846
 Antipathes assimilis (Brook, 1889)
 Antipathes atlantica Gray, 1857
 Antipathes brooki (Whitelegge & Hill, 1899)
 Antipathes caribbeana Opresko, 1996
 Antipathes catharinae (Pax, 1932)
 Antipathes ceylonensis (Thomson & Simpson, 1905)
 Antipathes chamaemorus Pax & Tischbierek, 1932
 Antipathes chota Cooper, 1903
 Antipathes contorta (Brook, 1889)
 Antipathes craticulata Opresko, 2015
 Antipathes curvata van Pesch, 1914
 Antipathes delicatula Schultze, 1896
 Antipathes dendrochristos Opresko, 2005
 Antipathes densa Silberfeld, 1909
 Antipathes dichotoma Pallas, 1766
 Antipathes dofleini Pax, 1915
 Antipathes dubia (Brook, 1889)
 Antipathes elegans (Thomson & Simpson, 1905)
 Antipathes erinaceus (Roule, 1905)
 Antipathes fragilis Gravier, 1918
 Antipathes fruticosa Gray, 1857
 Antipathes furcata Gray, 1857
 Antipathes galapagensis Deichmann, 1941
 Antipathes gallensis Thomson & Simpson, 1905
 Antipathes gracilis Gray, 1860
 Antipathes grandiflora Silberfeld, 1909
 Antipathes grandis Verrill, 1928
 Antipathes grayi Roule, 1905
 Antipathes griggi Opresko, 2009
 Antipathes herdmanni Cooper, 1909
 Antipathes hypnoides (Brook, 1889)
 Antipathes indistincta (van Pesch, 1914)
 Antipathes irregularis (Thomson & Simpson, 1905)
 Antipathes irregularis Cooper, 1909
 Antipathes irregularis Verrill, 1928
 Antipathes lenta Pourtalès, 1871
 Antipathes lentipinna Brook, 1889
 Antipathes longibrachiata van Pesch, 1914
 Antipathes minor (Brook, 1889)
 Antipathes nilanduensis Cooper, 1903
 Antipathes orichalcea Pallas, 1766
 Antipathes pauroclema Pax & Tischbierek, 1932
 Antipathes plana Cooper, 1909
 Antipathes plantagenista (Cooper, 1903)
 Antipathes pseudodichotoma Silberfeld, 1909
 Antipathes regularis Cooper, 1903
 Antipathes rhipidion Pax, 1916
 Antipathes rubra Cooper, 1903
 Antipathes rubusiformis Warner & Opresko, 2004
 Antipathes salicoides Summers, 1910
 Antipathes sarothrum Pax, 1932
 Antipathes sealarki Cooper, 1909
 Antipathes sibogae (van Pesch, 1914)
 Antipathes simplex (Schultze, 1896)
 Antipathes simpsoni (Summers, 1910)
 Antipathes speciosa (Brook, 1889)
 Antipathes spinulosa (Schultze, 1896)
 Antipathes taxiformis Duchassaing, 1870
 Antipathes tenuispina (Silberfeld, 1909)
 Antipathes ternatensis Schultze, 1896
 Antipathes thamnoides (Schultze, 1896)
 Antipathes tristis (Duchassaing, 1870)
 Antipathes umbratica Opresko, 1996
 Antipathes viminalis Roule, 1902
 Antipathes virgata Esper, 1788
 Antipathes zoothallus Pax, 1932

References

Antipathidae
Hexacorallia genera
Taxa named by Peter Simon Pallas